Christopher Joseph Wall (23 December 1942 – 28 December 2021) was an associate of former Taoiseach Bertie Ahern. He served as Ahern's election agent at the 2007 general election, and after the election he was nominated by the Taoiseach to serve as a Senator for the final weeks of the 22nd Seanad. He filled one of the vacancies caused by the election of four of the nominated Senators to Dáil Éireann.

A former Irish athlete, Wall served as the International Secretary for BLE (the forerunner to Athletics Ireland) from 1984 to 2000.

He died on 28 December 2021.

References

1942 births
2021 deaths
Fianna Fáil senators
Members of the 22nd Seanad
Nominated members of Seanad Éireann
Politicians from Dublin (city)